

Events

1500s
 1503 - Antonio de Saldanha lands at Table Bay

1550s
 8 June 1552 - The Portuguese galleon São João is wrecked near Port Edward. Only 25 out of the 480 survivors who undertook a 165 days march to the mouth of the Maputo River in what is now Mozambique arrived
 1554 - The Portuguese ship Saint Benedict is shipwrecked on the coast of what is now called St. Lucia. The survivors named the estuary Rio dos Medos do Ouro (alternatively Rio dos Médãos do Ouro — River of the Gold Dunes)

1570s
 13 December 1575 - on the feast of Saint Lucy, Manuel Peresterello renamed Rio dos Medos do Ouro to Santa Lucia

1580s
 18 July 1580 - An English admiral, Sir Francis Drake, rounded the Cape on his voyage round the world. He called it "a most stately thing and the fairest cape we saw in the whole circumference of the earth"
 1589 - The Portuguese ship Sao Thome is shipwrecked near Sodwana Bay

1590s
 1593 - A Portuguese ship, the Santo Alberto is lost off the coast of what is now known as the Wild Coast, Eastern Cape Province. It is believed to be near the Mthatha River
 1594 - 1601 - James Lancaster, an English navigator, explores the southern African coast and establishes trade relationships with the Khoikhoi

Deaths
 29 May 1500 - Bartolomeu Dias drowns at sea near the Cape of Good Hope
 1 March 1510 - Francisco de Almeida, the Viceroy of Portuguese India, is killed by the Khoikhoi at the mouth of the Salt River in Table Bay, after engaging in provocations towards the indigenous people

References

See Years in South Africa for list of References

History of South Africa